Avrora (meaning 'Aurora'), is an album by the Russian band Leningrad, released in 2007.

Track listing
"Вокруг света" -  (Around the World) - 00:55
"Hello, Moscow!" - 02:23
"Музыка Для Мужика" -  (Music for a Guy) - 03:08
"Паганини" - Paganini - 02:08
"Бухло" - Buhlo (Booze) 02:48
"И так далее" -  (and so on) - 02:52
"Про ковбоев" - Pro kovboev (About cowboys) - 03:01
"Бабцы" - Babtsi (Broads) - 02:50
"Полный пиздец" -  (Completely fucked up) - 03:05
"Ремонт" - Remont (Repairs) - 02:33
"Про Шнура" - Pro Shnura (About Shnur) - 02:44
"Ночи напролёт" -  (Night after night) - 02:37
"Яблочко" - Yablochko (Little apple) - 02:23
"Перемен" - Peremen (Change) - 01:59
"Кислотный DJ" - Kislotniy DJ (Acid DJ) - 02:18
"Эй, ухнем!" -  (Hey-ho!) - 02:46
"Паганини—ремикс" - Paganini-remiks (Paganini remix) - 02:55
"Бабцы—ремикс" - Babtsi-remiks (Broads remix) - 04:49
"Роботы-ебоботы (бонус трек)" - Roboti-eboboti (bonus trek) - (Robots-fuckobots (bonus track)) - 03:32
"Дача (бонус трек)" - Dacha (bonus trek) - (Cottage (bonus track)) - 02:29
"Паганини (бонус видео)" - Paganini (bonus video)

External links
Official Leningrad website

2007 albums
Leningrad (band) albums